Malcolmia is a genus of flowering plants from the family Brassicaceae. Species from this genus are native to Europe and Africa.

Several species are cultivated for their flowers, including Virginia stock (Malcolmia maritima).

Species include:

Malcolmia africana
Malcolmia boissieriana
Malcolmia littorea
Malcolmia maritima
Malcolmia turkestanica

References

External links 
 Jepson Manual Treatment
 GRIN Species List

Brassicaceae
Brassicaceae genera